The 2018 G20 Buenos Aires summit was the thirteenth meeting of Group of Twenty (G20), which was held on 30 November and 1 December 2018 in the city of Buenos Aires, Argentina. It was the first G20 summit to be hosted in South America.

Preparations 
President Mauricio Macri of Argentina assumed the one-year G20 presidency on 30 November 2017, during an official ceremony at the Kirchner Cultural Centre in Buenos Aires. President Xi Jinping of China (2016 host), Chancellor Angela Merkel of Germany (2017 host), and Prime Minister Shinzō Abe of Japan (2019 host) all sent messages of support, which were shown at the ceremony.

The first G20 meetings of the Argentine Presidency began in Bariloche in early December 2017. They were attended by central bank deputy governors and deputy ministers of finance, as well as the sherpas. During the buildup to the G20 Summit between world leaders on 30 November 2018, Argentina hosted over 45 meetings at various government levels and areas in 11 different cities throughout the country.

Participating leaders
List of leaders who took part in the 2018 G20 Buenos Aires summit:

Participating guests

As the host nation, Argentina invited additional guest countries and international organizations at its discretion to participate in 2018 G20 meetings. The countries invited by Argentina are Chile and the Netherlands. International organizations invited by Argentina are the Caribbean Community (represented by Jamaica), the Inter-American Development Bank, and the Development Bank of Latin America (CAF).

Most of the leaders were accompanied by their spouses.

Agenda priorities
G20 Argentina has put forth three agenda priorities for the G20 dialogue in 2018: the future of work, infrastructure for development and a sustainable food future.

A number of attending countries have said they focus on the regulation of crypto-currencies at this meeting.

Talks between the U.S. and China related to resolving the escalating 2018 China–United States trade war were a central issue of the summit.

Outcomes

On Friday 30 November, ahead of the formal start of the summit, outgoing Mexican President Peña Nieto, U.S. President Donald Trump, and Canadian Prime Minister Justin Trudeau signed the United States–Mexico–Canada Agreement (USMCA), a proposed replacement to the 1994 North American Free Trade Agreement (NAFTA).

Counter-summit
The Latin American Council of Social Sciences (CLACSO) had organized a counter-summit, called the First World Forum of Critical Thinking, which took place in the week leading up to the G20 event. It was attended by other politicians such as former Brazilian president Dilma Rousseff, Bolivian vice president Álvaro García Linera, former Colombian president Ernesto Samper, and human rights activist Estela de Carlotto. At the event, former Argentine president Cristina Fernández de Kirchner criticised the economic policies of Mauricio Macri and the IMF loans that he has received. Former Uruguayan president José Mujica was also invited, but declined to take part in the counter-summit to avoid damaging Argentina–Uruguay relations.

Security
The previous summit in Hamburg, Germany, met with huge protests, with cars set on fire and roads blocked by protesters. The 2018 summit had reinforced security, to prevent a repeat of those protests. Local left-wing organizations planned protests and called for foreign activists to join them. The Argentine government, working alongside the others, is attempting to prevent the entry of troublemakers into the country, such as people with criminal charges or who have advocated for violent actions. Only peaceful protests will be allowed. Federal Security Minister Patricia Bullrich said that "We will not permit illegal acts. Those who want to cross the line will have to face the legal consequences". 22,000 police and 700 security ministry agents will guard the event, working alongside the security services of the United States, the United Kingdom, Brazil, Italy, Spain and others. An area of  around the  will be cordoned off, the public transportation network – including the metro – will be shut down, and traffic along the River Plate will be halted. Friday, 30 November was declared a one-time public holiday day in the city of Buenos Aires, to prevent the traffic caused by people's daily activities, and residents were urged to leave the city for the long weekend. Media Minister Hernán Lombardi reported that no infiltration by international terrorist groups had been detected, and the US government said that the remote location of Argentina would discourage international protesters from travelling to the country.

Two bomb attacks took place in the days before the summit. Judge Claudio Bonadio, who was investigating former president Cristina Fernández de Kirchner for embezzlement charges, was attacked in his home; his bodyguards stopped Marco Viola, who was arrested, and the bomb was dismantled by a police bomb squad. Anahi Esperanza Salcedo, who identifies as an anarchist and a radical feminist, tried to bomb the tomb of the late chief of police Ramón Lorenzo Falcón at La Recoleta Cemetery, but her bomb went off early and she was hospitalized with injuries to her hand and face. Both attacks were made with improvised explosive devices. After those events, the United Kingdom government lowered its terrorism alert for Buenos Aires from "very likely" to "likely".

References

External links

 

2018 conferences
2018 in Argentina
2018 in international relations
21st-century diplomatic conferences (Global)
Diplomatic conferences in Argentina
Events in Buenos Aires
2018
November 2018 events in South America
December 2018 events in South America
Presidency of Mauricio Macri